Lu Miaoyi (born March 2010) is a Chinese chess player. She has a peak FIDE rating of 2399 and is one of two girls under age 14 rated above 2250 along with Alice Lee. Lu drew media attention when she reached a rating of 2200 shortly after turning 10 years old by finishing in ninth place in the Liberec Open in the Czech Republic and winning the 52nd Medjunarodni Velemajstorski Turnir Sahistkinja in Belgrade with a performance rating near 2400. Lu earned her first Woman Grandmaster (WGM) norm in the Serbian Women's League in November 2022 by defeating Lilit Mkrtchian, an International Master (IM), in an 18-move miniature.

Lu was born in a chess family in which her mother Xu Yuanyuan is a chess player who holds the title of Woman Grandmaster (WGM) and her grandfather Xu Tao is amateur chess player who won the Beijing Junior Chess Championship as a child. Lu was first introduced to chess at age three at her mother's chess club, and played her first FIDE-rated tournament at age five. Her mother began formally teaching her how to play at age seven.

References

External links 
 FIDE profile

2010 births
Living people
Chinese female chess players